John Ritchie (August 12, 1831 – October 27, 1887) was a U.S. Representative from Maryland, and a judge of the Maryland Court of Appeals.

Education
Born in Frederick, Maryland, Ritchie completed preparatory studies at the Frederick Academy.  He commenced the study of medicine but abandoned it for the study of law at Harvard University.  He was admitted to the bar and began practice in Frederick in 1854.

Early career
Ritchie served as captain of the Junior Defenders (militia) and was ordered by President James Buchanan to the scene of John Brown's raid at Harpers Ferry.  He also served as State's attorney for Frederick County, Maryland, from 1867 to 1871.

Congress and judicial work
Ritchie was elected as a Democrat to the Forty-second Congress (March 4, 1871 – March 3, 1873).  He was an unsuccessful candidate in 1872 for reelection to the Forty-third Congress, and resumed the practice of law in Frederick.  He was appointed by Governor William Thomas Hamilton on March 16, 1881, chief judge of the sixth judicial circuit and associate justice of the Maryland Court of Appeals to fill the unexpired term of Judge Richard Bowie.

Ritchie was elected in November 1881 to this office for a term of fifteen years and served until his death in Frederick, Maryland, October 27, 1887.
He was interred in Mount Olivet Cemetery.

References

External links

 

1831 births
1887 deaths
Judges of the Maryland Court of Appeals
Harvard Law School alumni
Politicians from Frederick, Maryland
American militia officers
Democratic Party members of the United States House of Representatives from Maryland
Burials at Mount Olivet Cemetery (Frederick, Maryland)
19th-century American politicians
19th-century American judges